This is a list of franchise records for the Vancouver Canucks of the National Hockey League, which dates from the 1970–71 season to present.

Regular season

All Players

Points

Goals

Assists

Games played

Major Penalties

Minor Penalties

Hat-tricks

Game-winning goals

Power-play goals

Short-handed goals

Overtime goals

Consecutive games played

*denotes active streak

Defencemen

Points

Goaltenders

Games played

Wins

Shutouts

Goals against average

*minimum 50 games played

Save percentage

*minimum 50 games played

Coaches

*for the purpose of comparison, shootout wins are excluded

Playoffs

All Players

Points

Goals

Assists

Games played

Penalty minutes

Hat-tricks

Game-winning goals

Power-play goals

Short-handed goals

Overtime goals

Defencemen

Points

Goaltenders

Games played

Wins

Goals against average

*minimum 100 minutes played

Save percentage

*minimum 100 minutes played

Shutouts

Coaches

Single Season Records

Regular season

Team
Most wins by team: 54 in 2010–11 (coached by Alain Vigneault)
Most losses by team: 50 in 1971–72 
Most points by team: 117 in 2010–11 
Most goals by team: 346 in 1992–93
Fewest goals by team: 182 in 2016-17
Most goals against by team: 401 in 1984–85
Fewest goals against by team: 185 in 2010–11

Players
Most goals: Pavel Bure, 60 (twice; 1992–93, 1993–94)
Most assists: Henrik Sedin, 83 (2009–10) 
Most points: Henrik Sedin, 112 (2009–10) 
Most PIM: Donald Brashear, 372 (1997–98)
Most points, Defenceman: Quinn Hughes, 68 (2021-22)
Most points, Rookie: Elias Pettersson, 66 (2018–19)

Goalies
Most games played: Roberto Luongo, 76 (2006–07) 
Most minutes: Roberto Luongo, 4,490 (2006–07) 
Most wins: Roberto Luongo, 47 (2006–07) 
Most shutouts: Roberto Luongo, 9 (2008–09)
Longest shutout streak: Roberto Luongo, 242:36 (2008–09)
---For next 2 records goalie must play at least 30 games
Lowest GAA: Cory Schneider, 1.96 (2011–12) 
Highest save %: Cory Schneider, .937 (2011–12)

Playoffs

Team
Most wins by team: 15, 1994 (coached by Pat Quinn); 2011 (coached by Alain Vigneault)
Most goals by team: 76 in 1994
Most goals against by team: 69 in 2011 
Longest game: 138:06 (April 11, 2007, Round 1, Game 1 against Dallas Stars. Henrik Sedin scored winning goal.)

Players
Most goals: Pavel Bure, 16 (1993–94)
Most points: Pavel Bure, 31 (1993–94)
Most assists: Henrik Sedin, 19 (2010–11) 
Most PIM: Tiger Williams, 116 (1981–82)
Most points, defenceman: Quinn Hughes, 16 (2019-20)

Goalies
Most games played: Roberto Luongo, 25 (2011)
Most wins: Kirk McLean, 15 (1994) and Roberto Luongo, 15 (2011)
Most shutouts: Kirk McLean, 4 (1994) and Roberto Luongo, 4 (2011)
Longest shutout streak: Kirk McLean, 143:17 (1994)
Lowest GAA: Thatcher Demko, 0.64 (2020)
Highest save %: Thatcher Demko, .985 (2020)
Most shots faced in one game: Roberto Luongo, 76 (2007)
Most saves in one game: Roberto Luongo, 72 (2007)

See also
List of NHL players

References

External links
Vancouver Canucks All-Time Statistical Leaders on Canucks.com
Vancouver Canucks All-Time Statistical Leaders on NHL.com

Records
National Hockey League statistical records
records